At least three ships of the Confederate States Navy were named CSS Florida in honor of the third Confederate state:
 The blockade runner  was commissioned in January 1862, captured by the U.S. Navy in April 1862, and became 
 The cruiser  was commissioned in August 1862 and captured by the U.S. Navy while in port in Bahia, Brazil in October 1864
 The gunboat  was named CSS Florida prior to July 1862.

See also
 

Ships of the Confederate States Navy